The Bootleg Series Vol. 8: Tell Tale Signs: Rare and Unreleased 1989–2006 is a compilation album by singer-songwriter Bob Dylan released on Legacy Records in 2008. The sixth installment of the ongoing Bob Dylan Bootleg Series, it was originally released as a double-disc set, a limited edition triple vinyl album, as well as a three-disc expanded version. This latter edition of Tell Tale Signs includes a detailed 56-page book annotating the recordings by Larry Sloman, a book of photos The Collected Single Sleeves of Bob Dylan drawing on Dylan releases from around the world, plus a 7-inch vinyl single comprising two tracks from the set: "Dreamin' of You" and "Ring Them Bells".

Background 
The album spans the recording sessions for Oh Mercy, World Gone Wrong, Time Out of Mind, and Modern Times as well as a number of soundtrack contributions and previously unreleased live tracks from 1989 through 2006. The collection also includes a track from an abandoned album Dylan had started to record with David Bromberg in 1992, and Dylan's duet with Ralph Stanley "The Lonesome River".

Although Under the Red Sky, Good as I Been to You and Love and Theft were all recorded during this time period, no tracks from these sessions were included on Tell Tale Signs. An alternate version of "Series of Dreams" was included on Vol. 3 of the Bootleg Series. "Dreamin' of You", an outtake from the Time Out of Mind sessions, was offered for free download on Bob Dylan's site and was also sent to radio stations as a promotional single.

In the first week of October 2008, the entire album was made available in a free streaming format on National Public Radio's official website.

Reception

The album entered the Billboard 200 at number 6, becoming Dylan's 17th album to open in the top 10. It went on to sell over 600,000 copies. Tell Tale Signs currently maintains an 86% positive ("Universal acclaim") rating at Metacritic. It was also named the second best album of 2008 by Rolling Stone magazine.

CBS's announcement that the two-CD set would sell for $18.99 and the three-CD version for $129.99 drew charges of "rip-off pricing" from Dylan biographer Michael Gray and other critics.

Track listing
All songs written by Bob Dylan except as indicated.

Deluxe Edition
The official Bob Dylan website offered a deluxe edition of the album, including a 150-page book and a bonus disc of tracks on top of the regular edition. Fans who pre-ordered the deluxe set directly from Bob Dylan's website also received an exclusive 7" vinyl. The first 5,000 customers were also given a Theme Time Radio Hour poster. The Bootleg Series Vol. 8 was also released on vinyl as 4 x 180g. LPs, plus a digital download and a 12" x 12" version of the book authored by Larry Sloman.

See also
The Bootleg Series Vol. 17: Fragments – Time Out of Mind Sessions (1996–1997) - 2023 compilation of further demos and outtakes from the Time Out of Mind sessions

References

External links
Exclusive Preview: Bob Dylan's Tell Tale Signs at NPR
[ Tell Tale Signs] at AllMusic

2008 compilation albums
Albums produced by Bob Dylan
Albums produced by Daniel Lanois
Albums recorded at Electric Lady Studios
Bob Dylan compilation albums
Columbia Records compilation albums